Cinque Vie is a small village (curazia) of San Marino. It belongs to the municipality of Serravalle.

See also
Serravalle
Cà Ragni
Dogana
Falciano
Lesignano
Ponte Mellini
Rovereta
Valgiurata

Curazie in San Marino
Serravalle (San Marino)